Harford may refer to:

Places
Australia
 Harford, Tasmania, a locality in Tasmania

United States
 Harford, Pennsylvania a village in Susquehanna County
 Harford, New York, a town in Cortland County
 Harford County, Maryland

United Kingdom
 Harford, Devon

Other uses
 Harford (surname)

See also
 Hartford (disambiguation)